The Pakistan Marines or simply as Pak Marines, is an expeditionary and amphibious warfare uniform service branch within the Pakistan Navy, consisting of the naval officers and other personnel to perform their duties within the Marines. Pakistan Marines are responsible for providing force protection in littorals, using the mobility of the Pakistan Navy to provide creeks defence, ground based air defence and Force protection.

In the Pakistani military leadership structure, the Marines are the expeditionary and amphibious branch within the Navy, often working closely with the Pakistan Army for training, executing expeditionary operations and logistics purposes.

Initially established and commissioned on 1 June 1971 in East-Pakistan, to assist Pakistan Army in riverine warfare. GHQ employed this infant force in successfully evacuating Pakistan Army units from encirclement by Indian Army. They were headquartered in PNS Bakhtiar and PNS Titumir to oversee the tactical riverine /waterborne operations. This small but valiant force soon started to make  significant impact on retrograde waterborne operations of Pakistan and saved many lives. Post war scenario led to their decommissioning in 1974 due to no riverine area of operations left with Pakistan that time.

On 25 November 1990, the Marines were re-organized and recommissioned under Cdr. Obaidullah–since then they have been a component of the Navy, conducting expeditionary operations with the special forces of army and the navy. The Marines are primarily tasked with quick response and marine reconnaissance objectives to guard the coastal and amphibious regions of the country, and receives training at the School of Infantry and Tactics by the Pakistan Army's instructors.

In 2010, Marines, in close co-ordination with the Pakistan Army, Navy, and Air Force, were working around the clock to rescue villagers trapped by the country's worst deluge in 80 years.

History
 

The Pakistan Marines traces their history back to Eastern Pakistan when the infantry battalion, dedicated towards the amphibious operations with the Pakistan Army, was commissioned in the Navy on 1 June 1971. Initially, the Marines were modeled based on the British Royal Marines and were aimed towards conducting independent expeditionary and amphibious operations in a geographical region that was essentially a dead-level plain, which made it difficult for the Pakistan Army to conduct mechanized operations, though an ideal theatre for amphibious ground forces.

The Marines were initially tasked to counter the Indian Army in Chittagong and Khulna with only four patrol boat and improvised imported amphibious vehicles. Due to lack of training and vessels, misunderstanding of the amphibious terrains, operational capabilities, the Marines failed to produced any significant results to counter the insurgency that resulted in their decommissioning  in 1974.

Nonetheless, the Marines continued to exists in its rudimentary form until 1988 to meet the fundamental security requirements of Pakistan Navy offshore establishments in the country. Following the introduction of the Mistral weapon system in the Navy, the Marines were re-commissioned under Cdr. Obaidulla (PN. Service number 1558) with Manora Fort at the vicinity of the PNS Qasim serving its first forward base on 14 April 1990.

Per Navy's request, the Pakistan Army undertook the training of the new Marines personnel at the Pakistan Military Academy in Kakul and later at the School of Infantry and Tactics in Quetta, aiming to raise an infantry unit to guard the offshore establishments of the Navy.

Initially, the Marines objectives were to provide security and cover to the offshore establishments of the Navy while aiding the federal government using the Navy's mobility. Headquarters of the Marines was relocated from the PNS Himalaya (Navy's only boot camp) to the Manora Fort in the PNS Qasim that was renamed as Marine Base Qasim in 1994.  The commissioning Marines consisted of eighty commissioned officers, sixty seven chief petty officers from general service and forty three Marines. Its first battalion was activated in September 1971.

As part of the first combat assignment, the Marines were deployed at the Sir Creek region during the last decade, threat on the South-Eastern border increased manifolds, warranting an immediate response.

Estimating the type and quantum of threat, the Pakistan Navy proposed deployment of a sizable force in the Sir Creeks region. The then-Rear Admiral Shahid Karimullah vigorously pursued the case of an additional battalion and its phase-wise development plan. Since its inception, Creeks Battalion is deployed in its designated Area of Responsibility.

On 28 March 2013, Pakistan Navy commissioned the third battalion of Pakistan Marines in order to further strengthen the defense of the Gwadar Port and to enhance the security of vital Pakistan Navy assets and installations along the western coasts of Pakistan.

Training center
Marine Training center is situated in Gwadar, Balochistan.

Organizationn

Marines Headquarters

The headquarters of the marines were initially set up in the Naval Base Dacca in East Pakistan in 1971 but relocated in the Karachi after the third war with India. In 1990, the Marines were organized in PNS Himalaya initially, but the organizational command was relocated in Manora Fort located in the PNS Qasim that was renamed as Qasim Marine Base in 1995. General military administration and logistics for the Marines are operated from the Qasim Marine Base in Karachi.

The Marines maintains and control the inter-services liaison communication between the Army and the Marines from the Marine Base Qasim, overseeing the military training and instructions on the weapon system provided by the Army instructors and weapon system specialists.

Marines bases, camps, and battalions

The Pakistan Marines operations are primarily controlled from the Qasim Marine Base but are stationed in Joint Army-Marine Base Sir Creek, Army Base Ormara, Gwadar Marine Camp and Marine Base Punjab. Since 1998, the Army helped Navy to raise six infantry battalions (approximately ~800 personnel), commanded by an officer with rank of Commander.

Personnel

Leadership and training

The Commander, Coastal Areas (COMCOAST), designated as the Chief of Staff Marines (CSM), is the highest-ranking officer in the Marines, usually at a rank of three-star, reporting directly to the Chief of Naval Staff.

The officer candidates are directed to attend the Pakistan Naval Academy in Karachi in order to gain commissioned in the Marines, where the candidates pass out in courses relating the military history and training, training for the soldier recruits are conducted at the PNS Himalaya– the initial entry training center ("boot camp") of the Navy. Following the award of their commissions, marines officers and personnel attend the Marine Training Center (MTC) located at the PNS Qasim to learn infantry and combined arms warfare, usually instructed by Pakistani Army specialists. At the MTC, the Marines completes the Basic Marines Course that included the instructions on comprehensive physical training in unarmed combat, close-quarter battle, security duties, swimming, small-arms handling and infantry tactics.

After passing the basic marine training course, the Marines are directed to attend the Pakistan Army's School of Infantry and Tactics in Quetta where they are trained together with army personnel. Since 1999, the Marines have been instructed to operate the Mistral missile system, ordnance, and special security courses to protect naval bases on coastal areas.

The Marines formations and personnel wears the camouflage uniforms when deployed to an operational environment but otherwise they wear Navy dress uniforms in public and international ceremonies.

Commissioned officers and Enlisted rank
The Marines are the branch within the Navy, therefore, using the same ranks and insignia as equivalent to the Pakistan Navy as contrary to the U.S. Marines in the United States and the Royal Marines in the United Kingdom.

Honours and awards

Wartime Gallantry Awards

Photo gallery

References

External links
Marine and SSG homepage
Pakistan Marines on globalsecurity.org

 
Military units and formations established in 1971
Military units and formations disestablished in 1974
Military units and formations established in 1990
Marines